This is a list of years in Montenegro.

16th century

17th century

18th century

19th century

20th century

21st century

Further reading

External links
 

 
Montenegro history-related lists
Montenegro